The 2013 German Darts Masters was the seventh of eight PDC European Tour events on the 2013 PDC Pro Tour. The tournament took place at the Glaspalast in Sindelfingen, Germany, between 20–22 September 2013. It featured a field of 64 players and £100,000 in prize money, with £20,000 going to the winner.

Steve Beaton won his first European Tour title by defeating Mervyn King 6–5 in the final.

Prize money

Qualification

The top 32 players from the PDC ProTour Order of Merit on the 2 July 2013 automatically qualified for the event. The remaining 32 places went to players from three qualifying events - 20 from the UK Qualifier (held in Barnsley on 12 July), eight from the European Qualifier and four from the Host Nations Qualifier (both held at the venue in Sindelfingen on 19 September).

Phil Taylor withdrew from the event before it started and was replaced by an additional European Qualifier. Ted Hankey suffered whiplash injuries a week earlier in a minor car crash and had not recovered in time to participate in the event. He was replaced by an additional Host Nation Qualifier.

1–32

UK Qualifier
  Paul Amos (second round)
  Kevin McDine (first round)
  Michael Smith (second round)
  Andy Jenkins (first round)
  Mark Lawrence (first round)
  James Hubbard (first round)
  Darren Johnson (first round)
  Daryl Gurney (first round)
  Steve Brown (first round)
  Josh Payne (first round)
  Ricky Evans (first round)
  Dennis Smith (first round)
  William O'Connor (first round)
  Ross Smith (first round)
  Jamie Robinson (second round)
  Joe Murnan (first round)
  Alan Tabern (first round)
  Mickey Mansell (first round)
  Ted Hankey (withdrew)
  Mick Todd (first round)

European Qualifier
  Maik Langendorf (second round)
  Ryan de Vreede (first round)
  Mareno Michels (quarter-finals)
  Dragutin Horvat (first round)
  Ronny Huybrechts (first round)
  Mensur Suljović (first round)
  Jelle Klaasen (first round)
  Michael Rasztovits (first round)
  Vincent van der Voort (third round)

Home Nation Qualifier
  Tomas Seyler (first round)
  Michael Hurtz (first round)
  Dirk Becker (first round)
  Peter Schöffmann (first round)
  Max Hopp (first round)

Draw

References

2013 PDC European Tour
2013 in German sport